This is a list of Jamaican dishes and foods. Jamaican cuisine includes a mixture of cooking techniques, flavors, spices and influences from the indigenous people on the island of Jamaica, and the Africans and Indians who have inhabited the island. It is also influenced by the crops introduced into the island from tropical West Africa and Southeast Asia, which are now grown locally. Jamaican cuisine includes dishes from the different cultures brought to the island, while other dishes are novel or a fusion of techniques and traditions. A wide variety of seafood, tropical fruits, and meats are available.

Jamaican dishes and foods

 Ackee and saltfish, made from the local fruit ackee and dried and salted cod (saltfish). This is the national dish of Jamaica. It is often served with bread, Jamaican fried dumplings, bammy (cassava bread) or roasted breadfruit.
 Bammy, a kind of savoury cassava bread
 Breadfruit, served roasted, fried or boiled.
 Calabaza 
 Callaloo, Jamaican spinach-like veggie
 Cassava 
 Coco bread, made to sandwich the Jamaican patty
 Cornbread bun-like pastry
 Cow foot, stewed
 Curry goat 
 Curry Chicken 
 Dumpling, served boiled, fried, and/or baked
 Escoveitch fish 
 Green bananas, eaten boiled, or sliced and fried to make banana chips
 Jamaican festival, similar to Hushpuppy
 Hard dough bread (hardo bread)
 Jamaican patty, a savoury and spicy pastry filled with meats (beef, curried chicken, shrimp, lobster, etc), or other ingredients like ackee, callaloo, cheese, soy, steamed vegetables and more
 Jerk meats usually jerked: chicken, and pork
 Oxtail with (broad beans)
 Pan chicken (jerked chicken prepared and sold by street food vendors along with hard dough bread)
 Peanut, available raw, or hot and roasted as street food
 Peg bread 
 Peppered shrimp, spicy seasoned and cooked (red in colour)
 Plantain, eaten green or ripe as is; can be boiled or fried. Usually served as side dishes.
 Porridge, popular flavours include oatmeal, cornmeal, peanut, banana, plantain, and hominy corn porridge.
 Rice and peas, the most popular style of rice for everyday use, and is a Sunday staple of most Jamaican households
 Roast yam and saltfish (either 'cooked up' or roasted as well)
 Roast Conch
 Roti 
 Run down, a dish consisting of pickled mackerel, coconut milk, herbs and spices
 Solomon gundy, a salt herring pâté
 Stamp and Go, dried and salted cod (saltfish) fritters
 Stew peas, a stew of red peas (kidney beans) which may be vegetarian or have pieces of meat added such as cured pig's tail
 Sugarcane, peeled, which is chewed to obtain the juice, or can be bought as bottled sugarcane juice
 Sweet bread, softer than normal bread with a slight sweetness
 Sweet potato 
 Taro, locally known as dasheen and coco
 Taro dumpling 
 Tripe and Beans
 Water crackers
 Yam

Fruits

 Ackee
 Acerola cherry
 Breadfruit
 Coconut- young green coconuts provide coconut water and jelly, while the older coconuts are grated to make jamaican desserts, sweets and coconut milk
 Custard apple
 Guava
 Guinep
 Jackfruit
 June plum (Tahitian apple)
 Mango, many species available locally. The popular species are locally called East Indian, Number 11, Julie, Milli, Stringy, Tommy Atkins, Blackie, Bombay and Graham.
 Naseberry (known as Sapodilla throughout the rest of the Caribbean)
 Otaheite apple (Malay apple)
 Paw-paw (papaya)
 Passion fruit
 Pineapple
 Pomegranate
 Soursop
 Starapple
 Starfruit
 Sweetsop
 Tamarind

Desserts and sweets

 Asham 
 Blue Draws, also called tie-a-leaf because it is cooked in tied banana leaves
 Bulla cake
 Busta coconut sweets (Bustamante Backbone)
 Cocktion 
 Coconut drop (Cut cake)
 Cornmeal Pudding
 Devon House Ice Cream (variety of quality flavours)
 Gizzada, also called Pinch-Me-Round 
 Grater cake 
 Peanut Drops
 Plantain Tart
 Rock cake
 Rum cake
 Spice Bun / Easter Bun, a popular sweet loaf (sometimes includes raisins or fruit), regular Bun is eaten all year, Easter Bun is often eaten around Easter
 Sweet Potato Pudding
 Tamarind Balls, tamarind fruit rolled into balls and lightly coated with sugar
 Toto

Herbs, spices and condiments

 Allspice, known locally as pimento
 Cinnamon
 Cloves
 Curry powder, Jamaican or Indian, which features a blend of turmeric, coriander, fenugreek, cumin, allspice, black pepper and cloves. Turmeric is the predominant spice and accounts for curry powder's yellow colour.
 Escallion
 Garlic
 Ginger
 Jamaican jerk spice, a blend of spices featuring allspice, locally known as pimento
 Nutmeg
 Pickapeppa sauce (usually made from small amounts of scotch bonnet pepper, and vinegar)
 Rosemary
 Scotch bonnet pepper
 Soya sauce
 Thyme leaves
 Turmeric

Soups
Soups play an important role in the Jamaican diet, not only as appetizers, but also as main lunch and dinner dishes because they are filling on their own with tubers/staples (such as yam, sweet potato, white potato, breadfruit, Jamaican boiled dumplings, dasheen and coco), vegetables (such as carrot, okra and cho-cho/chayote) and meat. Many Jamaican families enjoy soup for lunch and dinner. Soup is often had alone, but may be served with hard dough bread or Jamaican water crackers. Soups are almost always served piping hot.
 Chicken Foot Soup
 Conch or Janga (crayfish) Soup
 Cow cod soup 
 Fish Tea
 Gungo Peas Soup, made with pigeon peas (locally known as gungo peas)
 Mannish Water (Goat soup)
 Pepperpot Soup
 Red Peas Soup, made with kidney beans, pigstail, beef or chicken, tubers such as coco, yam, potato & sweet potato, vegetables and spices
 Pumpkin Soup, made with butternut squash, chicken, chayote (locally known as chocho), and various other vegetables depending on the region.

Beverages

Hot beverages
Most Jamaicans begin the morning with a hot drink, either alone, with Jamaican tough water crackers, bread or along with a breakfast dish.
 Jamaican Blue Mountain Coffee
 Chocolate tea (Hot chocolate), traditionally made from chocolate balls
 Herbal Tea, can be made using packaged tea bags, but is almost always brewed from fresh local herbs. The commonly consumed ones include ginger, and mint. These are the most popular types of beverages served with breakfast dishes.
 Horlicks 
 LASCO Food Drinks, instant powdered drinks made by adding hot or cold water, (Lasco Jamaica) with flavours such as vanilla, creamy malt, peanut punch, carrot, almond, etc. 
 Milo

Juices and cold beverages
Juices often include local fruits such as pineapple, Otaheite apple, june plum (Tahitian apple), acerola cherry, mango and guava, or combine them to make medleys such as guava-carrot and fruit punch. 

 Brown Streak beer - a popular beer brand in Jamaica
 Ginger beer 
 Jamaican rum
 Red Stripe beer
 Roots wine 
 Sorrel (drink), made from Jamaican sorrel (roselle), is enjoyed all year round but also drunk around Christmas holidays as a Christmas drink. White rum or wine is often added at Christmas.

See also

 List of street foods – Jamaica
 Outline of Jamaica

References

Lists of foods by nationality
Dishes
pepper / olives with eggs drink raw